Dicranomyia didyma is a species of fly in the family Limoniidae. It is found in the  Palearctic .

References

External links
Images representing Dicranomyia at BOLD

Limoniidae
Insects described in 1804
Nematoceran flies of Europe